Cazaza was a Spanish enclave on the western coast of Cape Three Forks, in what is today Morocco, around 18 km from Melilla. It was here that the exiled Boabdil, last Emir of Granada, landed when he left the Iberian Peninsula in 1492.

In 1505 Spanish forces based in Melilla led by Juan Alfonso Pérez de Guzmán, 3rd Duke of Medina Sidonia took Cazaza from the Wattasid Kingdom of Fez. King Ferdinand granted him the title 'Marquess of Cazaza', which survives to this day.  Although the noble title has endured, the Spanish lost control of Cazaza in 1533 because of the treachery of five of its garrison who betrayed it.

It was never rebuilt after the destruction when it was conquered. Its ruins are visible today.

See also

 European enclaves in North Africa before 1830

References 



Spanish Empire
Enclaves and exclaves
Reconquista